Daniel Font (born 22 February 1993) is a Welsh male badminton player.

Achievements

BWF International Challenge/Series
Men's Doubles

 BWF International Challenge tournament
 BWF International Series tournament
 BWF Future Series tournament

References

External links
 
 

1993 births
Living people
Welsh male badminton players
Commonwealth Games competitors for Wales
Badminton players at the 2014 Commonwealth Games